{{ESC National Year 
| Contest                = Junior
| Year                   = 2011
| Country                = Netherlands
| Preselection           = Junior Songfestival 201133% Jury33% Kids Jury33% Televoting| Preselection date      = Semi Final:17 September 201124 September 2011Final:1 October 2011
| Entrant                = Rachel Traets
| Song                   = Teenager
| SF result              = 
| Final result           = 2nd, 103 points
}}

Netherlands selected their Junior Eurovision entry for 2011 through Junior Songfestival'', a national selection consisting of 8 songs. The winner was Rachel with the song "Teenager".

Before Junior Eurovision

Junior Songfestival 2011 
The songs were split into two semi finals. From each semi final two sentries will qualify for the final based on the decision of adult and children juries as well as televoting. The fifth entry in the final will be chosen by online voting (web wildcard).

Semi Final 1

Semi Final 2

Final

At Junior Eurovision

Voting

Notes

References 

Junior Eurovision Song Contest
Netherlands
2011